The Blessed Hellride is the fourth studio album by American heavy metal band Black Label Society. It contains a mix of heavy ("Stoned and Drunk", "Stillborn") and lighter ("The Blessed Hellride", "Dead Meadow") tracks.

The second track, "Doomsday Jesus", was featured on the soundtrack to the video game MTX Mototrax, but with altered lyrics. The third track, "Stillborn", is featured on the soundtrack of the game Guitar Hero: World Tour. Frontman Zakk Wylde was also a playable celebrity rockstar in that same game.

Ozzy Osbourne appears on the first single, "Stillborn", though his name was not used to promote the track. He is credited inside the booklet, however, due to Osbourne being on Sony Records at the time, Spitfire Records were not allowed to promote this song with Osbourne's name—a sticker on the cover of the album said "featuring special guest star".

The Japanese bonus track "F.U.N." is a joke song, presumably recorded while Wylde and Craig Nunenmacher were horsing around in the studio. The song's lyrics poke fun at the cheesiest of the 1980s hair band's "party" lyrics; Wylde himself noted that "parody" would be a charitable term, saying "That song is so ridiculous, I don't think you could mock anybody... No one sucks that much."

A song called "No Other" was recorded, mixed, and mastered for this album, however, it remained unreleased until the next album, Hangover Music Vol. VI.

Track listing

Personnel
Black Label Society
Zakk Wylde – guitars, vocals, bass, piano
Craig Nunenmacher – drums

Production
Produced by Zakk Wylde
Associate producer and engineer – Eddie Mapp
Assistant engineers – Christopher Rakestraw and Steve Crowder
Mixed by Eddie Mapp and Zakk Wylde
Mastered by Steve Marcussen
Illustrations by Rob Arvizu
Management – Bob Ringe (Survival Management)

Charts

References

Additional sources

Blessed Hellride, The
Blessed Hellride, The
Spitfire Records albums